Chaetopodella is a genus of flies belonging to the family Sphaeroceridae, the lesser dung flies.

Species
Subgenus Afrochaetopodella Papp, 2008
C. keniaca Papp, 2008
C. reducta Papp, 2008
Subgenus Chaetopodella (Duda, 1920)
C. aethiopica Papp, 2008
C. cursoni (Richards, 1939)
C. demeteri Papp, 2008
C. denigrata (Duda, 1925)
C. impermissa (Richards, 1980)
C. latitarsis Hayashi & Papp, 2007
C. lesnei (Séguy, 1933)
C. nigeriae Papp, 2008
C. nigrinotum Hayashi & Papp, 2007
C. orientalis Hayashi & Papp, 2007
C. ornata Hayashi & Papp, 2007
C. scutellaris (Haliday, 1836)

References

 

Sphaeroceridae
Diptera of Asia
Diptera of Africa
Diptera of Europe
Brachycera genera
Taxa named by Oswald Duda